The 1911 Denver Pioneers football team was an American football team that represented the University of Denver as a member of the Rocky Mountain Conference (RMC) during the 1911 college football season. In their first and only season under head coach Thomas A. Barry, the Pioneers compiled a 5–2–1 record (3–1–1 against conference opponents), tied for second place in the RMC, shut out six of eight opponents, and outscored all opponents by a total of 81 to 22.

Schedule

References

Denver
Denver Pioneers football seasons
Denver Pioneers football